Première rêverie (English: First Reverie), also known in English as Whisperings of Love, is a painting by nineteenth-century French artist William-Adolphe Bouguereau. The work was completed in 1889 and is held at the New Orleans Museum of Art.

Background
William-Adolphe Bouguereau (1825–1905) was a French academic artist who began his career at the École des Beaux-Arts de Paris with depictions of Classical myths and legends, but soon came into demand in France and the United States for portraiture and decorative works. Although his work was ridiculed by contemporary artists such as Edgar Degas and Vincent van Gogh as overly finished and soft, Bouguereau was granted lavish praise during his lifetime, including multiple awards at the Salon de Paris. Of his highly polished, idealistic style, in which he used models with porcelain-like skin and depicted provincial themes, Bouguereau said "There's only one kind of painting. It's the painting that presents the eye with perfection, the kind of beautiful and impeccable enamel you find in Veronese and Titian."

Description
Première rêverie, which measures 157.48 x 92.71 cm (62 x 36 1/2 in), features a young woman sitting on rock with a vase beneath her arm and a Cupid whispering into her ear. The model for this painting, whose identity is unknown, also featured in Bouguereau's Boucles d'oreilles (1889–90), Le Travail interrompu (1891; Mead Art Museum), and Daphnis et Chloe.

Legacy and provenance
Bouguereau completed Première rêverie in early 1889, naming it Le chant de l'Amour (The Song of Love). In May of that year the work was sold to the art dealership Tooth and Sons and renamed Première rêverie. That August the dealership sold the painting to a person named Groves. The painting was later gifted to the New Orleans Museum of Art by Mr. and Mrs. Chapman H. Hyams; the museum's catalogue lists it as Whisperings of Love.  Eyewitness Books' guide to New Orleans lists the painting as one of the top ten exhibits at the museum, and Christie's considers the work one of Bouguereau's more important contemporary paintings.

A print of Bougureau's painting, produced by John Douglas Miller, is held at the Art Institute of Chicago under the title The First Whisper of Love; this title had previously been attached to the reduction when it was sold by Tooth and Sons.

In the catalogue raisonné for Bouguereau, Première rêverie has number 1889/06, whereas the reduction is listed as number 1889/06A.

See also
 William-Adolphe Bouguereau gallery

References

Mythological paintings by William-Adolphe Bouguereau
1889 paintings
Paintings of Cupid
Paintings in Louisiana